Forever Young is the debut studio album by German synth-pop band Alphaville. It was released on 27 September 1984 by Warner Music Group. Four singles supported the album, "Big in Japan", "Sounds Like a Melody", "Forever Young", and "Jet Set". The album charted well, hitting the Top 20 in six European countries and reaching number 1 in Norway and Sweden. Alphaville followed up with their second album in 1986 with the release of Afternoons in Utopia.

The album was re-released in a "super deluxe" edition in March 2019.

Background
The band released the single "Big in Japan" before the album had finished recording, and its success surprised the band and label. Said the band, "'[Big in Japan]' beamed us up into showbiz heaven, half of the album was still to be written. So, while we were in the middle of composing and arranging the residual songs, we were sort of overtaken by our future selves. … Once we wore tattered jeans and sweaty leather jacks … now we were homeless millionaires living in hotel suites and airports." Their sudden and unexpected success affected the rest of the album. In 1986, singer Marian Gold recalled that he "bought an album of an unknown British band named Big in Japan. As you know, there's a considerable musical market in Japan. If you wanted to become famous, what you should do was to form a hard rock group and then release an album over there; it would definitely sell well... so the story went ... The statement fitted well to my storyline about a couple of drug addicted lovers and moreover provided the title for the prospective song."

The first three tracks the band recorded were "Big in Japan", "Seeds", which was released as the b-side to "Big in Japan", and "Forever Young", which was originally recorded as an up-tempo track. The band was not happy with the fast version of "Forever Young", and recording of the track had come to a halt while the band figured out what to do with the song. It was producer Andreas Budde who suggested turning the track into a ballad, which is how the song was released.

The band had planned to release "Forever Young" as their second single, to follow the success of "Big in Japan". However, record studio executives requested that the band release an additional song between the two singles, and as a result "Sounds Like a Melody" was written and arranged in just two days. Of the experience, Gold said "the whole affair felt like an insult to our naive hippie instincts. Writing music exclusively for the sake of commercial success seemed like the sell-out of our virtual beliefs. On the other hand, did this not open up possibilities for wonderful games to play in the brave new world of pop music?" This corporate pressure caused Gold to dislike the song and he refused to play it live for over 15 years.

Some songs they wrote for the album were sung in German ("Blauer Engel", "Traumtänzer", and "Leben Ohne Ende"), but none of the songs ended up making it on the actual release, instead being released as b-sides or on later retrospective albums. Colin Pearson, who co-produced the album, said that Marian Gold would occasionally have problems with lyrics, and then he would remember that Gold was writing in a foreign language.

Band member Bernhard Lloyd said the album was recorded using equipment such as Roland TR-808 and Linn LM-1 drum machines, a Roland System-100M, an ARP String Ensemble and a Roland SDE 200 Digital Delay machine. The album was recorded on Tascam 8-track tapes, and they used a Friendchip SRC machine to synchronize all the tracks.

Songs
The song "Summer in Berlin" contains references to the East German uprising of 1953, which occurred on 17 June 1953. When the compilation album Alphaville Amiga Compilation was assembled for release in East Germany in 1988, the song "Summer in Berlin" was submitted for inclusion, but rejected "for political reasons."

"Fallen Angel" was written after "Big in Japan" was released, and the band said "everything changes when you're Number One. The world becomes a big shopping mall where all is for free, people, objects, what-ever. There is something vulgar about all this."

In 1988, Gold said that "’In The Mood’ is very likely about us, about how we felt in 1984, though we didn't realize that when we wrote it. The rocket-like success of "Big In Japan" was mind-blowing and irritating at the same time and we were scandalized by a horror of losing our artistic innocence ever since we had signed that record-deal.”

On the song "The Jet Set", Gold said of the song, "We didn't intend to write a proper song; it was supposed to be some kind of jingle that advertises things money can't buy: anarchy, freedom, love, fun and a piece of the end of the world."

Critical reception 

Reviews were generally positive, with one reviewer calling it "a classic synth pop album" and "a wonderfully fun ride from start to finish."

Chart performance
The album fared well in parts of Europe, but it failed to make an impact on the UK charts or in the US, faring no better than number 180.

The single "Big in Japan" made a surprise entry onto the US Billboard Hot 100 at number 66, where it stayed on the chart for several weeks.

Although the title track "Forever Young" was re-released several times as a single by the band's label in the hope of it becoming a hit in the United States, it did not reach any higher than number 65 on the Hot 100. Although it reached one position higher than "Big in Japan", it quickly fell into obscurity and "Big in Japan" remains their biggest-selling single in the US. "Big in Japan" also managed to peak at number 8 on the UK Singles Chart, while "Forever Young" was also considered a commercial failure there, reaching number 98.

Re-release
On 15 March 2019, the album was remastered for the first time for its 35th anniversary. The package comes with two additional CDs, one with original single versions, B-sides and remixes and the other with 16 original demos. The other disc is a DVD that includes a 60-minute documentary and promo videos. There is also a super deluxe edition that includes the new remaster on vinyl and comes with a 24-page vinyl-sized booklet, created by the art director of the original album in close collaboration with the band and contains a variety of rare and unpublished photos, sleeve notes and various other testimonies.

Track listing

2019 remaster
On 10 January 2019, it was officially announced that the album reissue of Forever Young would be released on 15 March 2019.
The Forever Young reissues were published in several editions:

Super Deluxe Edition 3-CD/1-DVD/1-Vinyl; the original 10-track album on the first disc, also original singles, b-sides and 12″ versions remixes on a second disc, Only on super deluxe it includes 16-track original demos including German-language songs on a third disc, the fourth disc is the DVD that includes a brand new documentary and promo music videos, the package also includes a remastered vinyl of the original 10-track album.
Deluxe Edition 2-CD; the original 10-track album on the first disc, including original singles, b-sides and 12″ versions remixes on a second disc.
Separate Remastered Vinyl one-LP; the original 10-track album remastered by Bernhard Lloyd and Stefan Betke.

Disc 1 — The original 10-track album

Personnel 

Alphaville
 Marian Gold – lead and backing vocals
 Bernhard Lloyd – rhythm keyboards, programming, electric guitar, drum machine
 Frank Mertens – lead keyboards

Additional musicians
 Wolfgang Loos – additional keyboards, gong
 Ken Taylor – bass
 Curt Cress – drums, percussion
 Wednesday, Gulfstream, The Rosie Singers, The Claudias – backing vocals
 German Opera – strings, string arrangements

Production
 Produced by Wolfgang Loos, Colin Pearson and Andreas "Andy" Budde
 Recorded and engineered by Wolfgang Loos and Uli Rudolph
 Technical assistance by Boris Balin and Thomas Beck
 Mixed by Wolfgang Loos
 Artwork, Cover Design by Ulf Meyer zu Küingdorf
 Inner Sleeve Photography by Thomas Reutter
 Management by Heinz-Gerd Luetticke

Charts

Weekly charts

Certifications and sales

References

1984 debut albums
Alphaville (band) albums
Atlantic Records albums
Warner Music Group albums